The Grammy Award for Best Salsa/Merengue Album was first awarded in 2004. Before 2004 the awards for Best Salsa Album and Merengue Album were separate.

Years reflect the year in which the Grammy Awards were presented, for works released in the previous year.

Recipients

See also

Grammy Award for Best Tropical Latin Album

Salsa Merengue Album
Salsa music
Merengue music
Awards established in 2004
Awards disestablished in 2006
Album awards